Veerapandi is a suburb of Salem, Tamil Nadu, India, 14 km from the old bus stand, 13 km from the new bus stand and 14 km from Salem Junction. Today it has the main college area in Salem.  The biggest center for higher learning is the Vinayaga Missions University near Veerapandi.

Temples
It had lot of hindu religious Temple , Especially 1008 Shiv Linnga and several religious temple.  It have Church too. Around 4kilometere.

Festivals
The main festivals such as marriyaman kovil, angalamman kovil, etc. take place in the city.  In the month of April the marriyaman festival is celebrated around 15 Days with lot of formalities and procedures.

Economy
The main occupation is agriculture.. Textiles and finance are common business in this area. Both Genders have been working all around the city.

Amenities
In general Veerapandi has all its basic amenities and can be reached at any time from anywhere because of the excellent road transport facility it has with the nearest town "Salem".

It has a railway station name is Virapandy road railway station with passenger train service to go to Erode and Salem Junction.

It has a government high school and elementary school.

It has polytechnic Colleges
 Kongu Polytechnic College
 Rajaji Indtitute of Technology

It has Medical College
 VIMS Medical College

It has Engineering College 
 Annapoorana Engineering College

Politics
Veerapandi assembly constituency is part of Salem (Lok Sabha constituency).

References

Neighbourhoods in Salem, Tamil Nadu